W Korea is a women's beauty magazine published by Doosan Magazine under license from Condé Nast Publications. A famous person, usually an actress, singer, or model, is featured on the cover of each month's issue. Following are the names of each cover subject from the most recent issue to the first issue of W Korea under editorship of Lee Hye Joo in March 2005.

2005

2006

2007

2008

2009

2010

2011

2012

2013

2014

2015

2016

2017

2018

2019

2020

2021

2022

References

External links

W Korea
W Korea
Magazines published in Korea